757 may refer to:
 Boeing 757: a narrow-body airliner
 AD 757: a year
 757 BC: a year
 757 (number): a number
 Area code 757: covering the Hampton Roads and Eastern Shore areas of Virginia
 "The 757": A common local nickname for the Hampton Roads area, taken from the area code